Kivu Ruhorahoza is a Rwandese film director, writer and producer. He is internationally known for his feature film Grey Matter which won the Jury Special Mention for Best Emerging Filmmaker at the 2011 Tribeca Film Festival and the Ecumenical Jury special mention at the 2011 Warsaw Film Festival. He also won the Grand Prize of the Tübingen French Film Festival, Best Director and Signis Award of the Cordoba African Film Festival and the Jury Special Prize of the Khouribga African Film Festival in Morocco.

Born in Kigali on December 6, 1982, Kivu entered the film career working in 2004 as a production assistant for Eric Kabera, a Rwandan producer, he was then promoted to production manager, where he used to assist news crews coming to Rwanda from the BBC or CNN, however his passion was film.

Kivu Ruhorahoza arrived on the international film platform in 2007 with his first short film Confession which won the City of Venice Award at the Milan African, Asian and Latin American Film Festival and was screened at the Venice Film Festival. His second short film Lost in the South(2008) won Best African Short Film at the Vues D'Afrique Festival in Montreal and was screened at the Rotterdam International Film Festival.

Grey Matter

In 2011 Kivu Ruhorahoza lifted his career after releasing his first feature film Grey matter, a film about trauma and madness in the aftermath of the 1994 Rwandan genocide. The film was produced in Rwanda in unstable financial situations, but it had a great success and went on to play at international prestigious film festivals including Tribeca, Melbourne, Warsaw, Rotterdam, Dubai, Durban, Göteborg and the Festival do Rio.

Thing of the Aimless Wanderer

In 2014, Kivu started the production of his second feature Things of the Aimless Wanderer, a film about the sensitive topic of relations between “locals” and Westerners. A film about paranoia, mistrust and misunderstandings, the film was entirely shot on a BlackMagic Cinema Camera , with a small budget and an entirely local crew. It was officially selected to premiere in Sundance Film Festival in the New frontier program.

References

http://www.tribecafilm.com/festival/features/Kivu_Ruhorahoza_Grey_Matter.html#.UTH4ajBTBp5 "Tribeca Film Festival on Kivu Ruhorahoza"

External links

1982 births
Living people
Rwandan film directors